The 2014 Port Huron Patriots season was the third season for the Continental Indoor Football League (CIFL) franchise.

In June 2013, the Patriots agreed to terms with the CIFL to return for the 2014 season. On April 11, 2014, Jude Carter fired Head Coach Demar Cranford for "a lack of leadership and team performance."

Roster

Schedule

Regular season

Standings

Coaching staff

References

2014 Continental Indoor Football League season
Port Huron Patriots
Port Huron Patriots